José Calistro ( – 1875) was the last chief of the Coast Miwok community who resided at Rancho Nicasio, which was once a Native American rancho that stretched from present-day Nicasio, California to Tomales Bay.

Notes

References
1870 United States Federal Census, Marin County, California.
 Miller, George. 2000. Additional Views, 106th Congress Report: House of Representatives, 2d Session, 106–677, Graton Rancheria Restoration Act 
 Munro-Fraser, J.P. History of Marin County, California. Alley, Bowen, 1880.
 Papina, Anne M. 2008. Nicasio (Arcadia Publishing, 2008).

1830s births
1875 deaths
Native American leaders
People from Marin County, California
Miwok people